The Union Public Service Commission, commonly abbreviated as UPSC, is India's premier central recruitment agency for recruitment of all the Group 'A' officers under Government of India. It is responsible for appointments to and examinations for the Group 'A' posts of several  central government establishments which also includes the central public sector undertakings and the central autonomous bodies. While Department of Personnel and Training is the central personnel agency in India.

The agency's charter is granted by Part XIV of the Constitution of India, titled as Services Under the Union and the States. The commission is mandated by the Constitution for appointments to the services of the Union and All India Services. It is also required to be consulted by the Government in matters relating to the appointment, transfer, promotion and disciplinary matters. The commission reports directly to the President and can advise the Government through him. Although, such advice is not binding on the Government. Being a constitutional authority, UPSC is amongst the few institutions which function with both autonomy and freedom, along with the country’s higher judiciary and lately the Election Commission.

The commission is headquartered at Dholpur House, in New Delhi and functions through its own secretariat. Dr. Manoj Soni has been the Chairman of UPSC since 5 April 2022.

Established on 1 October 1926 as Public Service Commission, it was later reconstituted as Federal Public Service Commission by the Government of India Act 1935; only to be renamed as today's Union Public Service Commission after the independence.

History 
The Royal Commission on the superior Civil Services in India was set up under the chairmanship of Lord Lee of Fareham by the British Government in 1923. With equal numbers of Indian and British members, the commission submitted its report in 1924, recommending setting up of a Public Service Commission. The Lee Commission proposed that 40% of future entrants should be British, 40% Indians directly recruited, and 20% Indians promoted from the provincial services.

This led to the establishment of the first Public Service Commission on 1 October 1926 under the chairmanship of Sir Ross Barker. A mere limited advisory function was granted to the Public Service Commission and the leaders of the freedom movement continually stressed on this aspect, which then resulted in the setting up of a Federal Public Service Commission under the Government of India Act 1935.

The Federal Public Service Commission became the Union Public Service Commission after independence. It was given a constitutional status with under of Constitution of India on 26 January 1950.

Constitutional status 
Articles 315 to 323 of Part XIV of the constitution, titled as Services Under the Union and the States, provide for a Public Service Commission for the Union and for each state. Accordingly, as per Art. 315, at Union level, Union Public Service Commission is envisaged by it. UPSC is amongst the few institutions which function with both autonomy and freedom, along with the country’s higher judiciary and lately the Election Commission.

Appointment 
As per Art. 316, the Chairman and other members of Union Public Service Commission shall be appointed by the President. In case the office of the Chairman becomes vacant his duties shall be performed by one of the other members of the Commission as the President may appoint for the purpose.

Also, nearly half of the members of the Commission shall be persons who at the dates of their respective appointments have held office for at least ten years either under the Government of India or under the Government of a State. A member of a Union Public Service Commission shall hold office for a term of six years from the date on which he enters upon his office or until he attains the age of sixty-five years, whichever is earlier. Under Art 318, the President is empowered to determine number of members of the Commission and their conditions of service. Further, he can make provision with respect to the number of members of the staff of the Commission and their conditions of service too. Also, conditions of service cannot be varied to his disadvantage after his appointment.

As per Art 319, a person who holds office as Chairman shall, on the expiration of his term of office, be ineligible for re-appointment to that office. But, a member other than the Chairman of the Union Public Service Commission shall be eligible for appointment as the Chairman of the Union Public Service Commission, or as the Chairman of a State Public Service Commission, but not for any other employment either under the Government of India or under the Government of a State. Also, the Chairman of a State Public Service Commission shall be eligible for appointment as the Chairman or any other member of the Union Public Service Commission.

Removal and suspension 
As per Art. 317, the Chairman or any other member of a Public Service Commission shall only be removed from their office by order of the President on the ground of "misbehaviour" after the Supreme Court, on reference being made to it by the President, has, on inquiry reported that the Chairman or such other member ought to be removed. The President may suspend the Chairman or other member of the Commission until report of the Supreme Court is received.

The President may also remove the Chairman or any other member of the commission if he/she/they:
 is/are adjudged an insolvent; or
 engage/s during their term of office in any paid employment outside the duties of their office; or
 is/are, in the opinion of the President, unfit to continue in office by reason of infirmity of mind or body.
 The Chairman or any other member cannot hold an office of profit or otherwise they shall be deemed to be guilty of misbehaviour.

Functions 
As per Art. 320, it shall be the duty of the Union Public Service Commissions to conduct examinations for appointments to the services of the Union. It shall also assist two or more States, if requested so, in framing and operating schemes of joint recruitment for any services.

The Union Public Service Commission shall be consulted:
 on all matters relating to
 methods of recruitment to civil services and for civil posts
 making appointments to civil services and posts
 making promotions and transfers from one service to another
 the suitability of candidates for such appointments, promotions or transfers
 on all disciplinary matters against a civil servant serving in a civil capacity, including memorials or petitions relating to such matters.
 on any claim by or in respect of a person who is serving or has served in a civil capacity, that any costs incurred by him in defending legal proceedings instituted against him in respect of acts done or purporting to be done in the execution of his duty should be paid out of the Consolidated Fund of India.
 on any claim for the award of a pension in respect of injuries sustained by a person while serving in a civil capacity, and any question as to the amount of such award.
It shall be the duty of a Union Public Service Commission to advise on any matter referred to them; provided that the President has not made any regulations specifying the matters in which it shall not be necessary for Union Public Service Commission to be consulted.

Expenses 
As per Art. 322, the expenses of the Union Public Service Commission, including any salaries, allowances and pensions payable to or in respect of the members or staff of the Commission, shall be charged on the Consolidated Fund of India.

Extension of functions 
As per Art. 321, an Act made by Parliament may provide for the exercise of additional functions by the Union Public Service Commission w.r.t. services of the Union.

Reporting 
As per Art. 323, it will be the duty of the Union Commission to annually present a report to the President of the work done by the Commission. On receipt of such report, the President shall present a copy before each House of Parliament; together with a memorandum, if any, explaining the reasons where the advice of the Commission was not accepted by him.

Organizational structure 
The Commission consists of the chairman and other members appointed by The President of India. Usually, the Commission consists of 9 to 11 members including the chairman. Every member holds office for a term of six years or until he attains the age of sixty-five years, whichever is earlier.

The terms and conditions of service of chairman and members of the Commission are governed by the Union Public Service Commission (Members) Regulations, 1969.

The chairman and any other member of the Commission can submit his resignation at any time to the President of India. He may be removed from his office by the President of India on the ground of misbehaviour (only if an inquiry of such misbehavior is made and upheld by Supreme Court) or if he is adjudged insolvent, or engages during his term of office in any paid employment outside the duties of his office, or in the opinion of the President unfit to continue in office by reason of infirmity of mind or body.

Secretariat 
The Commission is serviced by a Secretariat headed by a Secretary with four Additional Secretaries, a number of Joint Secretaries, Deputy Secretaries and other supporting staff. The secretariat, for administrative purpose, is further divided into divisions, each undertaking having a specific responsibility:
 Administration: Administers the Secretariat as well as looks after personal matters of Chairman/Members and other Officers/Staff of the Commission.
 All India Services: Recruitment to All India Services is done either by direct recruitment, through Civil Services Examination or by promotion from the State Service. The AIS Branch handles the promotions of State Service officers to the IAS, IPS and IFS. It also handles policy matters relating to All India Services and amendments in the 'Promotion Regulations' of respective services.
 Appointments: It carry out appointments to central services based on Promotion(based on proposals from various Ministries/Departments/Union Territories and from certain local bodies) and by the means of Deputation and Absorption.
 Examinations: It carries out merit-based selection and recommendation of candidates, through various examinations such as the Engineering Services Examination, Medical Services Examination, Defence Services Examination, Civil Services Examination, etc, to Group A and Group B Services of the Government of India.
 General: Primarily deals with day-to-day housekeeping works for Commission, like, arrangements and facilitation for conduction of Examinations by the UPSC, printing Annual Report etc.
 Recruitment: This branch carries out Direct Recruitment(out of the 3 possible mechanisms of : 'direct recruitment', 'recruitment by promotion' and 'recruitment by transfer and permanent absorption') by selection to all Group `A’ and certain Group `B’ posts of the services of the Union (including some Union Territories). These recruitment are done either by selection(interview) or through competitive examination.
 Recruitment Rules: The Commission is mandated under Art. 320 of the Constitution of India, read along the UPSC (Exemption from Consultation) Regulations, 1958, to advise on framing and amending of Recruitment and Service Rules for various Group A and Group B posts in the Government of India, and certain autonomous organizations like EPFO, ESIC, DJB, NDMC & Municipal Corporations(s) of Delhi. This Branch carries out this responsibility by facilitating the Ministries / Departments / UT Administrations / Autonomous Organisations in this regard.
 Services I: Handles disciplinary cases received from various Ministries/Departments and State Governments for advice of the Commission, as required under Article 320 (3)(c).
 Services II: Handles all other cases that 'Services I' branch doesn't. It compiles the Annual Report. Also, it coordinates visits of foreign delegations, correspondence with foreign countries and hosting of international events concerning Public Service Commissions, including the SAARC Member States.

Present members 
The institute is currently having seven members including the Chairman against its sanctioned strength of ten members.

List of chairmen 
Following is the list of Chairman of UPSC:

See also

 List of Public service commissions in India

References 

 
1926 establishments in India
Government agencies established in 1926